Henry Roth  (1906–1995) was an American novelist and short story writer.

Henry Roth may also refer to:

 Henry Ling Roth (1855–1925), anthropologist
Henry Roth, character in 50 First Dates

See also
Henry Roth House on National Register of Historic Places listings in Southeast Denver, Colorado
 Leon-Henri Roth (c. 1922–1945), WWII resistance